Catherine Sarah "Kate" Ferguson ( Lee; November 3, 1841 – May 30, 1928), better known by her pen name "Kate Lee Ferguson," was an American novelist, poet, and composer best known as the author of Cliquot (1889) and Little Mose (1891).

Biography 
Catherine Sarah Lee was born on November 3, 1841, in Lexington, Kentucky, where she was educated, to William Henry and Ellen (née Ware) Lee. On August 28, 1862, she married Lieutenant-Colonel Samuel Wragg Ferguson of the 28th Mississippi Cavalry Regiment and accompanied him on his various campaigns.

She shocked all of her acquaintances by appearing in 1886 in an amateur production of "Sea of Ice", a then popular drama, "assuming the part of a young Indian maid, in very inadequate clothing – her kirtie only coming down to the knees on one side, and not that far on the other, with bare arms, bare bosom, bare legs, and big bracelets round her ankles."

Published in 1889, Cliquot is the story of Neil Emory, who owns an unpredictable and dangerous horse named Cliquot, whom he cannot find a rider for, as the horse has already killed several previous riders.  A mysterious jockey appears who wins the owner a fortune and then turns out to be a beautiful woman named  Gwendoline Gwinn, the horse’s previous owner.  The story is imbued with lust in the "bodice-ripping style", where "female bosoms heave with desire and heroes express their love in ways that an earlier generation would have found much too suggestive."

Selected works

Novels 
 Cliquot: A Racing Story of Ideal Beauty (1889)
 Little Mose (1891)

Short stories 
 A Woman's Army Experience (1898)

See also  
 List of women writers

References

External links 

 Official
Kate Lee Ferguson Papers at the Louisiana State University
 General information
 
 Kate Lee Ferguson at Mississippi Writers and Musicians

1841 births
1928 deaths
19th-century American composers
19th-century American Episcopalians
19th-century American novelists
19th-century American poets
19th-century American short story writers
19th-century American women writers
20th-century American Episcopalians
19th-century women composers
American women composers
American women memoirists
19th-century American memoirists
American romantic fiction novelists
American women novelists
American women short story writers
Burials in Mississippi
Deaths in Mississippi
Novelists from Mississippi
People from Greenville, Mississippi
People from Harrison County, Mississippi
People from Lexington, Kentucky
People of Mississippi in the American Civil War
Poets from Mississippi
Women romantic fiction writers
Writers of American Southern literature
19th-century American women musicians
20th-century American women
Percy family of Mississippi